Philip Edward Day (born October 1965) is a Dubai-based British billionaire businessman, and the CEO and owner of The Edinburgh Woollen Mill Group, which owns Peacocks, Jaeger, Jane Norman, Austin Reed, and other high-street retailers.

As of May 2020, his net worth was £1.1 billion, according to the Sunday Times Rich List.

Early life
Philip Edward Day was born in October 1965. He grew up on a council estate in Stockport and while at school he held down a number of part-time jobs, including working at his parents' newsagents shop.

Turning down a place at university, Day started his career at clothing manufacturers Coats Viyella and Wensum before being headhunted to join Aquascutum at the age of 28. He remained at the brand for 5 years, becoming Joint Managing Director.

Career
In 2001, Day left Aquascutum and joined Edinburgh Woollen Mill, where he led a buyout of the company backed by Rutland Fund Management, a private equity firm. In 2002, he acquired the company for £67.5 million with the backing of Bank of Scotland. At the time, the company employed 3,140 people.

In 2008, EWM bought home furnishing company Ponden Mill and soft furnishings company Rosebys. The stores were rebranded as Ponden Home across the UK.

In 2009, Day bought Scottish golfing brand ProQuip for a reported £750,000. In 2011, Day acquired women's fashion retailer Jane Norman, which had fallen into administration.

In 2016, Day bought outfitters Austin Reed and Country Casuals from administration. Day said he planned to open 50 new Austin Reed stores by 2018.

In 2017, Day acquired British fashion brand Jaeger, again from administration. Day said the acquisition was part of EWM's plan to open a new department store.

In July 2019, Day's company, Spectre Holdings, had acquired 93% of the women's fashion chain Bonmarche.

Peacocks 
In 2012, Day acquired fashion retailer Peacocks out of administration. Day is reported have put £200 million of his own money on the line for the acquisition. EWM bought 338 of the chain's stores and said that they would open another 50 stores. According to Forbes, the turnaround of Peacocks played a significant role in Day's success.

Days Department Stores 
In May 2017, Day announced the Days Department Stores. The first store opened in former BHS premises in Guildhall Square, Carmarthen. According to Drapers, Day plans to open more than 50 of the stores and has plans to open shops in Crawley and Bedford.

The department store stocks products from a number of EWM brands, including Peacocks, Edinburgh Woollen Mill, Ponden Home, Jane Norman, Jaeger, and Austin Reed.

Philanthropy
Day owns a wildlife sanctuary in Scotland which undertakes research into the preservation and reintroduction of endangered Scottish wildlife, including wolves and wildcats. The park has more than 14 species of deer. Day also owns the largest green energy Anaerobic Digester in the UK.

He is the main financial backer of Carlisle United F.C. although he says that he does not like football. He says he supports the team because otherwise it wouldn't exist. Edinburgh Woollen Mill is also the main shirt sponsor of the team.

Personal life

Day has been married to his wife Debra since 1990. He owns Edmond Castle, a Tudor-style house in Brampton, Cumbria, England, built 1824 to 1829, and designed by Sir Robert Smirke. Day is keen on shooting, especially pheasant and duck, and has been a director of Carlisle United, the local football club.

They have two daughters and one son. In 2016, their daughter Lauren Day joined the Edinburgh Woollen Mill Group board as group development director. In 2010, their daughter Kirstie Day won Miss Cumbria; and a leaked email from EWM's head office to its stores ordered staff to vote for her to become Miss England, "I need and expect all stores to register a minimum of 10 votes today and I mean everybody!"

In 2013, Day was fined £450,000, ordered to pay £457,000 in costs, and called "grossly negligent" by the judge, for clearing part of Gelt Woods, near Brampton, and a Site of Special Scientific Interest (SSSI), for a pheasant shoot. Day later pursued a negligence claim against the solicitors who acted for him, on the basis that negligent advice resulted in excessive court costs in the criminal proceedings, that negligence claim was dismissed by the High Court on 3 December 2021.

In February 2014, Day was due in Dumfries Sheriff Court on a charge of driving without due care and attention, after admitting to driving at 83 mph and overtaking unsafely on the A7 between Auchenrivock and Canonbie in February 2012.

As of 2017, Day lives in Dubai, and "spends fewer than 10 days a year in the UK".

References

1965 births
Living people
British billionaires
British expatriates in the United Arab Emirates
British retail chief executives
People from Cumbria
People from Stockport